Paul Daumont (born 1 September 1999) is a Burkinabé road cyclist. Born in the Central African Republic to a French father and a Central African mother, he was selected by Burkina Faso to compete in the road race at the 2020 Summer Olympics.

Major results

2018
 2nd Road race, National Under-23 Road Championships
 7th Overall Tour du Faso
 7th Overall Tour de l'Espoir
2019
 1st  Road race, National Under-23 Road Championships
 1st Overall Tour de Côte d'Ivoire
1st Stages 1 & 3 (ITT)
 2nd Road race, National Road Championships
 2nd Overall Tour du Togo
1st Stage 3
 3rd  Road race, African Under-23 Road Championships
2020
 1st GP 14-Ouagadrogou
 4th Overall Grand Prix Chantal Biya
1st Stages 2 & 5
2021
 1st  Road race, National Road Championships
 1st  Road race, National Under-23 Road Championships
 1st Overall Tour du Bénin
1st Stages 1, 2, 3 & 6
 1st GP Cham-Hagendorn
 Tour du Cameroun
1st Points classification
1st Stages 2 & 8
 1st Stages 2 & 5 Tour du Mali
 3rd  Time trial, African Under-23 Road Championships
 5th Overall Tour du Faso
1st  Young rider classification
2022
 1st GP 14-Ouagadrogou
 1st Grand Prix Abidjan
 1st GP Dafani
 2nd Overall Tour de Côte d'Ivoire
1st Stages 1, 3 & 4
 4th Overall Tour du Cameroun
1st Young rider classification
2023
 9th Road race, African Road Championships

References

External links

1999 births
Living people
People from Bangui
Naturalized citizens of Burkina Faso
Burkinabé male cyclists
Olympic cyclists of Burkina Faso
Cyclists at the 2020 Summer Olympics
21st-century Burkinabé people
Burkinabé people of French descent
Burkinabé people of Central African Republic descent
Sportspeople of Central African Republic descent